Israel Lyons the Younger (1739–1775), mathematician and botanist, was born at Cambridge, the son of Israel Lyons the elder (died 1770). He was regarded as a prodigy, especially in mathematics, and Robert Smith, master of Trinity College, took him under his wing and paid for his attendance.

Biography
Due to his Ashkenazi Jewish origins, Lyons was not permitted to become an official member of the University of Cambridge. Nevertheless, his brilliance resulted in his publication Treatise on Fluxions at the age of 19, and his enthusiasm for botany resulted in a published survey of Cambridge flora a few years later. An Oxford undergraduate, Joseph Banks, paid Lyons to deliver a series of botany lectures at the University of Oxford. Lyons was selected by the Astronomer Royal to compute astronomical tables for the Nautical Almanac. Later, Banks secured Lyons a position as the astronomer for the 1773 North Pole voyage led by Constantine Phipps, 2nd Baron Mulgrave.

Lyons married, in March 1774, Phoebe Pearson, daughter of Newman Pearson of Over, Cambridgeshire, and settled in Rathbone Place, London. There he died of measles on 1 May 1775, at the age of only 36, while preparing a complete edition of Edmond Halley's works sponsored by the Royal Society.

See also
 European and American voyages of scientific exploration

References
 Lynn B. Glyn, "Israel Lyons: A Short but Starry Career. The Life of an Eighteenth-Century Jewish Botanist and Astronomer," Notes and Records of the Royal Society of London, Vol. 56, No. 3, 2002, pp. 275–305.

People associated with the University of Cambridge
18th-century English mathematicians
1739 births
1775 deaths
English botanical writers
Deaths from measles
18th-century British botanists
English people of Jewish descent
Jewish biologists